Reece Whitley (born January 3, 2000) is an American competitive swimmer specializing in the breaststroke. In 2019, he was named 2019 Pac-12 Men's Swimming Freshman of the Year. At age 15, he won the silver medal in the 100 meter breaststroke at the 2015 FINA World Junior Swimming Championships in Singapore, where he also finished 4th in the 200 meter breaststroke.

Whitley was named Sports Illustrated Kids' SportsKid of the Year for 2015.

Personal life

Whitley currently attends UC Berkeley. He graduated from William Penn Charter School in Philadelphia in 2018. He started taking swimming lessons at age 7 after failing a deep-water safety test. He also started playing basketball and baseball at age 7, but he stopped playing baseball after he broke his first swimming national age group record in 2012.

References

External links
 California Golden Bears bio

2000 births
Living people
American male breaststroke swimmers
Sportspeople from Montgomery County, Pennsylvania
California Golden Bears men's swimmers
William Penn Charter School alumni